Barn Island may refer to the following:
 Pulau Senang, Singapore
 Barren Island, Brooklyn, New York, United States